Asociația Fotbal Club Unirea 04 Slobozia,, commonly known as AFC Unirea Slobozia or simply as Unirea Slobozia, is a Romanian football club based in Slobozia, Ialomița County, which competes in the Liga II.

The team was founded in 1955 and reestablished in 2004, being for the most part of its history a participant in the third tier of the Romanian league system, the Liga III. Unirea Slobozia has also spent several seasons in the Liga II, first in the early 1990s and then between 2012 and 2015, when it also obtained its best ranking in the competition, namely a third place behind top flight regulars Politehnica Iași and Rapid București.

"The Yellow-Blues" play their home games at the Stadionul 1 Mai, which can host 6,000 spectators.

History
Founded in 1955, Unirea Slobozia has been for most of its history a classic Liga III team, as it only promoted to the Liga II for the first time in 1989. In the early 2000s, the club encountered financial isses and was dissolved, being refounded in 2004 as AFC Unirea 04 Slobozia.

The new entity also reached the second tier of the Romanian football league system, where it spent three years between 2012 and 2015. In the 2013–14 season, the team obtained a third place in its series, behind top flight regulars Politehnica Iași and Rapid București

Since the start of the 2020–21 campaign, Unirea Slobozia has been again competing in the Liga II.

Honours
Liga III
Winners (4): 1982–83, 1988–89, 2011–12, 2019–20
Runners-up (3): 1978–79, 1979–80, 2010–11

Liga IV – Ialomița County
Winners (3): 1969–70, 1997–98, 2004–05

Players

First team squad

}

Out on loan

Club officials

Board of directors

Current technical staff

League history

Notable managers

  Adrian Mihalcea
  Marian Catana
  Ion Cojocaru
  Vasile Dobrău
  Marin Dună
  Ion Ionescu
  Gheorghe Liliac
  Vladimir Marica
  Constantin Prepeliţă
  Ion Răuţă
  Eusebiu Tudor

External links
 
 

Association football clubs established in 1955
Slobozia
Football clubs in Ialomița County
Liga II clubs
Liga III clubs
1955 establishments in Romania